Creeping spikerush is a common name for several plants and may refer to:

Eleocharis palustris